"Zaryte" is also the name of part of the town of Rabka-Zdrój.

Zaryte  is a village in the administrative district of Gmina Kłoczew, within Ryki County, Lublin Voivodeship, in eastern Poland.

References

Zaryte